Sèvres may refer to:

Sèvres — a commune in the southwestern suburbs of Paris, France
Manufacture nationale de Sèvres — the Sèvres porcelain factory
Deux-Sèvres — a département in France
Sèvre Nantaise — a river in France
Sèvre Niortaise — a river in France
Sèvres - Babylone — a station of the Paris Métro
Treaty of Sèvres, an international treaty signed in 1919 concerning the Middle East
Protocol of Sèvres, a secret 1956 agreement between France, Israel and the United Kingdom concerning the Suez Crisis.